Encounters (also known as Voyage into Fear) is a 1993 Australian thriller about a woman and her husband who return to the estate where they grew up.

The movie was shot from 6 July to 1 August 1993.

It premiered in Brussels at the Mystery and Suspense Festival.

References

External links

1993 films
Australian thriller films
1990s thriller films
Films directed by Murray Fahey
1990s English-language films
1990s Australian films